Nassarius siquijorensis, common name the burned nassa, is a species of sea snail, a marine gastropod mollusk in the family Nassariidae, the nassa mud snails or dog whelks.

Description
The length of the shell varies between 20 mm and 43 mm.

The ovate, conical shell is somewhat ventricose. It is of a pale fawn color. The spire is composed of eight whorls. The upper ones are longitudinally folded, and slightly striated transversely ; the two lower ones smooth, convex and strongly canaliculated. The body whorl is furrowed at the base, and frequently ornamented about the middle with two bands of a chestnut color. The ovate aperture is white, its cavity brown. The outer lip is thick, denticulated upon the edge of the lower part and striated within. The left lip gives rise to a thin and elevated callosity upon the edge of the columella, and towards the top a very prominent transverse fold, forming the commencement of a canal.

Distribution
This species occurs in the Red Sea and in the Indian Ocean off the Mascarene Basin; off Japan.

References

 Cernohorsky W. O. (1984). Systematics of the family Nassariidae (Mollusca: Gastropoda). Bulletin of the Auckland Institute and Museum 14: 1–356.
 Vine, P. (1986). Red Sea Invertebrates. Immel Publishing, London. 224 pp.
 Drivas, J. & M. Jay (1988). Coquillages de La Réunion et de l'île Maurice

External links
 
 

Nassariidae
Gastropods described in 1852